Bob Corritore (born Robert Joseph Corritore; September 27, 1956) is an American blues harmonica player, record producer, blues radio show host and owner of The Rhythm Room, a music venue in Phoenix, Arizona. Corritore is a recipient of a Blues Music Award, Blues Blast Music Award, Living Blues Award and a Keeping The Blues Alive Award and more. He produced one album that was nominated for a Grammy Award and contributed harmonica on another.

Early life and education
Corritore was born in Chicago, Illinois, United States, but was raised from infancy in suburban Wilmette. At age 12, he began a love affair with the blues after hearing a Muddy Waters song on the radio. Shortly thereafter, he received his first harmonica from his younger brother. He took to it immediately and began teaching himself the instrument by playing along with records and using Tony "Little Son" Glover's book, "Blues Harp" -- the go-to instructional volume of the era -- as a guide. As soon as he was old enough, Corritore began attending blues concerts whenever he could, seeing Sam Lay and Waters perform at his high school and Jim Brewer, Eddie Taylor, Wild Child Butler and Detroit Junior at venues accessible to under-age patrons before venturing to Maxwell Street, the open-air market on Chicago's near South Side, where he caught Big Walter Horton and Big John Wrencher in action. 

After graduation from New Trier East High School, Bob attended the University of Tulsa, where he earned a Bachelor of Business Administration degree. He returned to Chicago, where he worked a job by day and pursued his musical education at night. As his skill and confidence improved in his later teens, he started playing in support of Willie Buck and Tail Dragger Jones. His first paying gig came in Buck's band at age 23 alongside Louis and Dave Myers, Johnny "Big Moose" Walker, Odie Payne Jr. and Taylor.

Career

Early career 
Corritore's first live performance came in his teens on Maxwell Street when John Henry Davis invited him to sit in for five or six numbers. He subsequently started attending performances at clubs on the South and West Sides, where he was mentored by Louis Myers, Lester Davenport, Junior Wells, Big Leon Brooks, Little Mack Simmons, Big Walter and others, who regularly invited him on stage to play. 

Corritore began a career in music production in 1979. He recorded harmonica player Little Willie Anderson, creating his own label, Blues On Blues Records, in the process. Released as Swinging The Blues and produced with the assistance of future Grammy winner Dick Shurman and Delmark Records owner Bob Koester, the LP debuted the same year and was reissued 13 years later in CD format on Earwig Music. A second release, Big Leon Brooks' Lets Go To Town, followed in 1982.

Phoenix years 
In 1981, Corritore relocated to Phoenix, Arizona, where he was joined a few months later by Louisiana Red. The pair worked together in duo and full-band formats for the next year before Red relocated to Germany. Corritore subsequently joined a succession of bands fronted by regional favorites Big Pete Pearson, Janiva Magness, Tommy Dukes and Buddy Reed. Years later they worked together again when Corritore produced Louisiana Red's Sittin' Here Wonderin'  (1995) (Earwig Music). Since 1984, Corritore has been hosting "Those Lowdown Blues," a five-hour Sunday night on KJZZ (FM).

Two years later, Corritore recruited former Howlin’ Wolf drummer Chico Chism to relocate from Chicago to Phoenix for various band and studio projects, a relationship that endured until his death in 2007. Corritore opened The Rhythm Room music venue in Phoenix in 1991. It has served as his home base ever since. He and hIs house band, the Rhythm Room All-Stars, have backed dozens of high-profile blues musicians, both at the club and in recording sessions, a roster that includes Bo Diddley, Pinetop Perkins, Ike Turner, Nappy Brown, Eddy Clearwater and many others.

His first release as a front man, All-Star Blues Sessions, came in 1999 on the HighTone label with Corritore playing in support of 16 blues artists, including Diddley, Chism, Robert Lockwood Jr., Henry Gray and other talents. That release established Corritore as both a harmonica player and producer in the blues community in a career that has included several subsequent releases under his own name, often sharing billing with other traditional blues artists, including John Primer, Gray, Kid Ramos and Dave Riley.

As a harmonica player, he has guested on albums by R.L. Burnside, Pinetop Perkins, Dave Mason, Zac Harmon, Louisiana Red, Nappy Brown, Diunna Greenleaf, Bob Margolin, Bill Howl-N-Madd Perry, Dave Specter, Smokin’ Joe Kubek, Mannish Boys, Kilborn Alley Blues Band, Tomcat Courtney, Big Pete Pearson, Sam Lay, Mud Morganfield, Johnny Tucker, Willie “Big Eyes” Smith, Ben Levin, Tom Walbank, Deb Ryder, Adrianna Marie, Sugaray Rayford, Tony Holiday, The Freemonts and several others. And he has served as producer for releases by R.L. Burnside, Mojo Buford, Kim Wilson, William Clarke, Chism and compilations released by several labels. The Wilson album -- Smokin' Joint, released on M.C. Records in 2001 -- was a finalist in the best traditional blues category at the 44th Annual Grammy Awards. He has released albums on the HighTone, Blue Witch, Delta Groove and SWMAF labels, as well as his current home, VizzTone.

Corritore has appeared at major blues events around the world including Chicago Blues Festival, Lucerne Blues Festival and Bellinzona Blues Sessions (Switzerland), Edmonton Blues Festival and Calgary Blues Festival (Canada), King Biscuit Blues Festival and Big Blues Bender (U.S.), Bossa Y Jazz and Pocas de Blues (Brazil), Cognac Blues Festival and Bay-Car Blues Festival (France), Marco Fiume Blues Passions Festival (Italy), Moulin Blues Ospel (Holland), Blues At The Savoy (Finland), Hondarribia Blues Festival (Spain), Lahnsteiner Blues Festival (Germany), Boquette Blues Festival (Panama) and more. He has also performed at the Kennedy Center, The Strathmore, The Dodge Theater, AVA Amphitheater and other prestigious venues.

An official endorser of Hohner harmonicas, Corritore regularly leads harmonics master classes at the Blues Foundation's annual International Blues Challenge week in Memphis. The editor and main writer of the Bob Corritore Blues Newsletter, his 2020 album, The Gypsy Woman Told Me, a partnership with John Primer, was a finalist for traditional blues album of the year in the Blues Blast Music Awards after winning the same honor for Don't Let The Devil Ride in 2019.

Awards and honors 
1999: Inducted into the Arizona Blues Hall of Fame.
2001: Kim Wilson's Smokin' Joint album, which Corritore produced, was a Grammy finalist in the traditional blues category
2007: Phil Gordon, the mayor of Phoenix, proclaimed September 29 as "Bob Corritore Day."
2007: Corritore appeared on Pinetop Perkins' On The 88s: Live in Chicago, a finalist in the traditional blues category at the 50th Annual Grammy Awards
2007: Honored by the Blues Foundation with a Keeping the Blues Alive Award for his radio work
2007: Blues Music Award nominee along with Dave Riley in the acoustic blues category for their CD, Travelin' The Dirt Road
2011, 2013 and 2019: Blues Music Award nominee for harmonica player of the year
2012: Living Blues magazine Readers Poll honoree as harmonica player of the year
2014: Blues411 Jimi Award winner for harmonica player of the year
2016: Blues Music Award nominee along with Henry Gray in the historical album category for their CD, Blues Won't Let Me Take My Rest Vol.1
2017: Blues Music Award nominee along with Big Jon Atkinson in the traditional album category for their CD, House Party At Big Jon's
2019: Blues Blast Music Award winner in the traditional album category for Don't Let The Devil Ride
2020: Blues Blast Music Award nominee along with John Primer in the traditional album category for their CD, The Gypsy Woman Told Me
2021: Living Blues magazine Critics Poll winner in best blues albums of 2020 category along with John Primer for The Gypsy Woman Told Me
2021: Blues Blast Music Award nominee in the traditional album category for Bob Corritore & Friends: Spider in My Stew
2021: Blues Blast Music Award nominee in the historical or vintage category along with Henry Gray for Cold Chills and with Kid Ramos for Phoenix Blues Sessions
2021: Inducted into the Arizona Music & Entertainment Hall of Fame
2022: Blues Music Award nominee for harmonica player of the year
2022: Blues Music Award nominee in the traditional blues album category for Spider in My Stew
2022: Blues Blast Music Award nominee in the traditional blues album category along with Louisiana Red for Tell Me 'Bout It
2022: Blues Blast Music Award winner in the historical or vintage category for Down Home Blues Revue

Discography

Albums

Guest

Producer

See also
List of electric blues musicians
List of harmonica blues musicians

References

External links
Official website
Live performance at the Rhythm Room (2011)

1956 births
Living people
American blues harmonica players
Record producers from Illinois
American session musicians
American radio DJs
Chicago blues musicians
Harmonica blues musicians
Electric blues musicians
Songwriters from Illinois
Blues musicians from Illinois
Nightclub owners